The Huangdi hama jing, translated into English as the Yellow Emperor's Toad Canon, is a Chinese medical text believed to have been written during the Han dynasty. Although the original manuscript is no longer extant, much of the text was quoted in the Ishinpō, the oldest surviving Japanese medical compendium.

Composition
A Japanese woodblock text titled Weisheng huibian, dated to 1823, contains content ostensibly copied from a Chinese text known as the Huangdi zhenjiu hama ji, or the Yellow Emperor's Toad Prohibition for Acupuncture and Cauterisation, which is recorded in the Book of Sui. Another source cited in Weisheng huibian is the Taiping yulan. The Taiping yulan in turn refers to the Baopuzi, which supposedly refers to a hama tu or "toad chart" in the now missing Huangdi yijing, although the extant version of the Baopuzi does not contain such a citation.

References

Citations

Cited works

Further reading

 

Chinese medical texts